The Ghana Empire, also known as Wagadou or Awkar, was a West African empire based in the modern-day southeast of Mauritania and western Mali that existed from c. 300 until  1100. The Empire was founded by the Soninke people, and was based in the city of Koumbi Saleh.

Complex societies, some based on trans-Saharan trade in salt and gold had existed in the region for centuries at the time of the empire's formation. The introduction of the camel to the western Sahara in the 3rd century AD served as a major catalyst for the transformative social changes that resulted in the empire's formation. By the time of the Muslim conquest of North Africa in the 7th century, the camel had changed the ancient, more irregular trade routes into a trade network running from Morocco to the Niger River. The Ghana Empire grew rich from this increased trans-Saharan trade in gold and slaves and salt, allowing for larger urban centers to develop. The traffic furthermore encouraged territorial expansion to gain control over the different trade routes.

When Ghana's ruling dynasty began remains uncertain among historians. The first identifiable mention of the imperial dynasty in written records was made by Muḥammad ibn Mūsā al-Khwārizmī in 830. Further information about the empire was provided by the accounts of Cordoban scholar Al-Bakri when he wrote about the region in the 11th century. 

After centuries of prosperity, the empire began its decline in the second millennium, and would finally become a vassal state of the rising Mali Empire at some point in the 13th century. Despite its collapse, the empire's influence can be felt in the establishment of numerous urban centers throughout its former territory. In 1957, the British colony of the Gold Coast, under the leadership of Kwame Nkrumah named itself Ghana upon independence in honor and remembrance of the historic empire, although their geographic boundaries never overlapped.

Etymology
The word ghana means warrior or war chief and was the title given to the rulers of the original kingdom whose Soninke name was Ouagadou. Kaya Maghan (king of gold) was another title for these kings.

History and accounts

Origin
Theorizing concerning the origins of Ghana has been dominated by disputes between ethnohistoric accounts and archaeological interpretations. The earliest discussions of its origins are found in the Sudanese chronicles of Mahmud Kati and Abd al-Rahman as-Sadi. According to Kati's Tarikh al-Fettash in a section probably composed by the author around 1580, but citing the authority of the chief judge of Messina, Ida al-Massini who lived somewhat earlier, twenty kings ruled Ghana before the advent of the prophet Muhammad, and the empire extended until the century after the prophet. In addressing the rulers' origin, the Tarikh al-Fettash provides three different opinions: that they were Soninke, Wangara (which are a Soninke group), or Sanhaja Berbers.

Al-Kati favored another interpretation in view of the fact that their genealogies linked them to this group, adding "What is certain is that they were not Soninke” (min al-Zawadi). While the 16th-century versions of genealogies might have linked Ghana to the Sanhaja, earlier versions, for example as reported by the 11th-century writer al-Idrisi and the 13th-century writer ibn Said, noted that rulers of Ghana in those days traced their descent from the clan of the Prophet Muhammad either through his protector Abi Talib, or through his son-in-law Ali. He says that 22 kings ruled before the Hijra and 22 after. 

While these early views lead to many exotic interpretations of a foreign origin of Wagadu, these views are generally disregarded by scholars. Levtzion and Spaulding, for example, argue that al-Idrisi's testimony should be looked at very critically due to demonstrably gross miscalculations in geography and historical chronology, while they themselves associate Ghana with the local Soninke. In addition, the archaeologist and historian Raymond Mauny argues that al-Kati's and al-Saadi's view of a foreign origin cannot be regarded as reliable. He argues that the interpretations were based on the later presence (after Ghana's demise) of nomadic interlopers from Libya, on the assumption that they were the historic ruling caste, and that the writers did not adequately consider contemporary accounts such as those of Ya'qubi (872 CE), al-Masudi (c. 944 CE), Ibn Hawqal (977 CE), and al-Biruni (c. 1036 CE), as well as al-Bakri, all of whom describe the population and rulers of Ghana as "negroes".

Oral traditions 

In the late 19th century, as French forces occupied the region in which ancient Ghana lay, colonial officials began collecting traditional accounts, including some manuscripts written in Arabic somewhat earlier in the century. Several such traditions were recorded and published. While there are variants, these traditions called the most ancient polity they knew of Wagadu, or the "place of the Wague" the term current in the 19th century for the local nobility. The traditions described the kingdom as having been founded by a man named Dinga, who came "from the east" (e.g., Aswan, Egypt), after which he migrated to a variety of locations in western Sudan, in each place leaving children by different wives. In order to achieve power in his final location he had to kill a goblin, and then marry his daughters, who became the ancestors of the clans that were dominant in the region at the time of the recording of the religion. Upon Dinga's death, his two sons Khine and Dyabe contested the kingship, and Dyabe was victorious, founding the kingdom.

Theories concerning the foundation of Ghana 
French colonial officials, notably Maurice Delafosse, whose works on West African history has been criticised by scholars such Charles Monteil, Robert Cornevin and others for being "unacceptable" and "too creative to be useful to historians" in relation to his falsification of West African genealogies, concluded that Ghana had been founded by the Berbers, a nomadic group originating from the Benue River and linked them to North African and Middle Eastern origins. While Delafosse produced a convoluted theory of an invasion by "Judeo-Syrians", which he linked to the Fulbe, others took the tradition at face value and simply accepted that nomads had ruled first. Raymond Mauny, synthesizing early archaeology, various traditions, and the Arabic materials in 1961 concluded that foreign trade was vital to the empire's foundation. More recent work, for example by Nehemiah Levtzion, in his classic work published in 1973, sought to harmonize archaeology, descriptive geographical sources written between 830 and 1400 AD, the older traditions of the Tarikhs, from the 16th and 17th centuries and at last the traditions collected by French administrators. Levtzion concluded that local developments, stimulated by trade from North Africa, were crucial in the development of the state, and he tended to favor the more recently collected traditions over the other traditions in compiling his work. While there has not been much further study of either traditions or documents, archaeologists have added considerable nuance. Christopher Ehret observes that the proposed founding date of c. 300 AD fits very well with what is known about the Wagadu state's control of the trans-saharan gold trade.

Contribution of archaeological research 
Archaeological research was slow to enter the picture. While French archaeologists believed they had located the capital, Koumbi Saleh, in the 1920s when they located extensive stone ruins in the general area given in most sources for the capital, others argued that elaborate burials in the Niger Bend area may have been linked to the empire. It was not until 1969, when Patrick Munson excavated at Dhar Tichitt (the site of a culture associated with the ancient ancestors of the Soninke people) in modern-day Mauritania that the probability of an entirely local origin was raised. The Dhar Tichitt site clearly reflected a complex culture present by 1600 BC and had architectural and material culture elements that seemed to match the site at Koumbi Saleh. In more recent work in Dhar Tichitt, and then in Dhar Nema and Dhar Walata, it has become more and more clear that as the desert advanced, the Dhar Tichitt culture (which had abandoned its earliest site around 300 BC, possibly because of pressure from desert nomads, but also because of increasing aridity) moved southward into the still well-watered areas of northern Mali. This now seems the likely history of the complex society that can be documented at Koumbi-Saleh.

Malinke rule
In his brief overview of Sudanese history, Ibn Khaldun related that "the people of Mali outnumbered the peoples of the Sudan in their neighborhood and dominated the whole region." He went on to relate that they "vanquished the Susu and acquired all their possessions, both their ancient kingdom and that of Ghana." According to a modern tradition, this resurgence of Mali was led by Sundiata Keita, the founder of Mali and ruler of its core area of Kangaba. Delafosse assigned an arbitrary but widely accepted date of 1230 to the event. This tradition states that Ghana Soumaba Cisse, at the time a vassal of the Sosso, rebelled with Kangaba and became part of a loose federation of Mande-speaking states. After Soumaoro's defeat at the Battle of Kirina in 1235 (a date again assigned arbitrarily by Delafosse), the new rulers of Koumbi Saleh became permanent allies of the Mali Empire. As Mali became more powerful, Koumbi Saleh's role as an ally declined to that of a submissive state, and it became the client described in al-'Umari/al-Dukkali's account of 1340.

Ibn Haukal, writing in 951 AD, informs us that the King of Ghana was “the richest king on the face of the earth".

Imperial decline
Given the scattered nature of the Arabic sources and the ambiguity of the existing archaeological record, it is difficult to determine when and how Ghana declined and fell. The earliest descriptions of the empire are vague as to its maximum extent, though according to al-Bakri, Ghana had forced Awdaghost in the desert to accept its rule sometime between 970 and 1054. By al-Bakri's own time, however, it was surrounded by powerful kingdoms, such as Sila. Ghana was combined in the kingdom of Mali in 1240, marking the end of the Ghana Empire.

A tradition in historiography maintains that Ghana fell when it was sacked by the Almoravid movement in 1076–77, although Ghanaians resisted attack for a decade, but this interpretation has been questioned. Conrad and Fisher (1982) argued that the notion of any Almoravid military conquest at its core is merely perpetuated folklore, derived from a misinterpretation or naive reliance on Arabic sources. Dierke Lange agrees but argues that this does not preclude Almoravid political agitation, claiming that Ghana's demise owed much to the latter. Sheryl L. Burkhalter (1992) was skeptical of Conrad and Fisher's arguments and suggested that there were reasons to believe that there was conflict between the Almoravids and the empire of Ghana. Furthermore, the archaeology of ancient Ghana does not show the signs of rapid change and destruction that would be associated with any Almoravid-era military conquests.

While there is no clear-cut account of a sack of Ghana in the contemporary sources, the country certainly did convert to Islam, for al-Idrisi, whose account was written in 1154, has the country fully Muslim by that date. Ibn Khaldun, a fourteenth-century North African historian who read and cited both al-Bakri and al-Idrisi, reported an ambiguous account of the country's history as related to him by 'Uthman, a faqih of Ghana who took a pilgrimage to Mecca in 1394, according to which the power of Ghana waned as that of the "veiled people" grew through the Almoravid movement. Al-Idrisi's report does not give any reason to believe that the Empire was smaller or weaker than it had been in the days of al-Bakri, 75 years earlier. In fact, he describes its capital as "the greatest of all towns of the Sudan with respect to area, the most populous, and with the most extensive trade." It is clear, however, that Ghana was incorporated into the Mali Empire, according to a detailed account of al-'Umari, written around 1340 but based on testimony given to him by the "truthful and trustworthy" shaykh Abu Uthman Sa'id al-Dukkali, a long term resident. In al-'Umari/al-Dukkali's version, Ghana still retained its functions as a sort of kingdom within the empire, its ruler being the only one allowed to bear the title malik and "who is like a deputy unto him."

Sosso occupation and successor states 

According to Ibn Khaldun, following Ghana's conversion, "the authority of the rulers of Ghana dwindled away and they were overcome by the Sosso...who subjugated and subdued them." Some modern traditions identify the Susu as the Sosso, inhabitants of Kaniaga. According to much later traditions, from the late nineteenth and twentieth centuries, Diara Kante took control of Koumbi Saleh and established the Diarisso Dynasty. His son, Soumaoro Kante, succeeded him and forced the people to pay him tribute. The Sosso also managed to annex the neighboring Mandinka state of Kangaba to the south, where the important goldfields of Bure were located.

Economy
Most of the information about the economy of Ghana comes from al-Bakri. Al-Bakri noted that merchants had to pay a one gold dinar tax on imports of salt, and two on exports of salt. Other products had fixed dues; al-Bakri mentioned both copper and "other goods." Imports probably included products such as textiles, ornaments and other materials. Many of the hand-crafted leather goods found in old Morocco also had their origins in the empire. Ibn Hawqal quotes the use of a cheque worth 42,000 dinars.
The main centre of trade was Koumbi Saleh. The king claimed as his own all nuggets of gold, and allowed other people to have only 'gold dust'. In addition to the influence exerted by the king in local regions, tribute was received from various tributary states and chiefdoms on the empire's periphery. The introduction of the camel played a key role in Soninke success as well, allowing products and goods to be transported much more efficiently across the Sahara. These contributing factors all helped the empire remain powerful for some time, providing a rich and stable economy that was to last several centuries. The empire was also known to be a major educational hub.
Ghana grew rich from the Trans-Saharan Trade by trading gold, iron and salt.

Government
Testimony about ancient Ghana depended on how well disposed the king was to foreign travelers, from whom the majority of information on the empire comes. Islamic writers often commented on the social-political stability of the empire based on the seemingly just actions and grandeur of the king. Al-Bakri, a Moorish nobleman living in Spain questioned merchants who visited the empire in the 11th century and wrote of the king:

Ghana appears to have had a central core region and was surrounded by vassal states. One of the earliest sources to describe Ghana, al-Ya'qubi, writing in 889/90 (276 AH) says that "under his authority are a number of kings" which included Sama and 'Am (?) and so extended at least to the Niger River valley. These "kings" were presumably the rulers of the territorial units often called kafu in Mandinka.

The Arabic sources are vague as to how the country was governed. Al-Bakri, far and away the most detailed one, mentions that the king had officials (mazalim) who surrounded his throne when he gave justice, and these included the sons of the "kings of his country" which we must assume are the same kings that al-Ya'qubi mentioned in his account of nearly 200 years earlier. Al-Bakri's detailed geography of the region shows that in his day, or 1067/1068, Ghana was surrounded by independent kingdoms, and Sila, one of them located on the Senegal River, was "almost a match for the king of Ghana."  Sama is the only such entity mentioned as a province, as it was in al-Ya'qubi's day.

In al-Bakri's time, the rulers of Ghana had begun to incorporate more Muslims into government, including the treasurer, his interpreter, and "the majority of his officials."

Koumbi Saleh
The empire's capital is believed to have been at Koumbi Saleh on the rim of the Sahara desert.

El-Ghaba 
According to al-Bakri, the major part of the city was called El-Ghaba and was the residence of the king. It was protected by a stone wall and functioned as the royal and spiritual capital of the Empire. It contained a sacred grove of trees in which priests lived. It also contained the king's palace, the grandest structure in the city, surrounded by other "domed buildings". There was also one mosque for visiting Muslim officials. (El-Ghaba, coincidentally or not, means "The Forest" in Arabic.)

Muslim district 
The name of the other section of the city is not recorded. In the vicinity were wells with fresh water, used to grow vegetables. It was inhabited almost entirely by Muslims, who had with twelve mosques, one of which was designated for Friday prayers, and had a full group of scholars, scribes and Islamic jurists. Because the majority of these Muslims were merchants, this part of the city was probably its primary business district. It is likely that these inhabitants were largely black Muslims known as the Wangara and are today known as Fulbe/Fulani and Jakhanke. The separate and autonomous towns outside of the main governmental center is a well-known practice used by the Fulbe and Jakhanke Muslims throughout history.

Archaeology 

A 17th-century chronicle written in Timbuktu, the Tarikh al-fattash, gave the name of the capital as "Koumbi". Beginning in the 1920s, French archaeologists excavated the site of Koumbi Saleh, although there have always been controversies about the location of Ghana's capital and whether Koumbi Saleh is the same town as the one described by al-Bakri. The site was excavated in 1949–50 by Paul Thomassey and Raymond Mauny and by another French team in 1975–81. The remains of Koumbi Saleh are impressive, even if the remains of the royal town, with its large palace and burial mounds, have not been located. Another problem for archaeology is that al-Idrisi, a twelfth-century writer, described Ghana's royal city as lying on a riverbank, a river he called the "Nile" following the geographic custom of his day of confusing the Niger and Senegal Rivers, which do not meet, as forming a single river often called the "Nile of the Blacks". Whether al-Idrisi was referring to a new and later capital located elsewhere, or whether there was confusion or corruption in his text is unclear. However, he does state that the royal palace he knew was built in 510 AH (1116–1117 AD), suggesting that it was a newer town, rebuilt closer to the Niger than Koumbi Saleh.

List of rulers

Soninke rulers ("Ghanas") of the Cisse dynasty
Kaya Magan Cissé(Also known as Dinga Cisse)
 Dyabe Cisse:  circa 790s
Bassi: 1040–1062
Tunka Manin: 1062–1076

Almoravid occupation
Abu Bakr ibn Umar: 1076–1086

Sosso rulers
Kambine Diaresso(sometimes also written as Jarisso) : 1087-1090
Suleiman: 1090-1100
Bannu Bubu: 1100-1120
Magan Wagadou: 1120-1130
Gane: 1130-1140
Musa: 1140-1160
Birama: 1160-1180

Rulers during Kaniaga occupation
Diara Kante: 1180-1202 
Soumaba Cisse as vassal of Soumaoro Kanté: 1203–1235

Ghanas of Wagadou Tributary
Soumaba Cisse as ally of Sundiata Keita: 1235–1240

See also
History of the Soninke people
Islam in Africa

References

Sources

.
. Gallica: Volume 1, Le Pays, les Peuples, les Langues; Volume 2, L'Histoire; Volume 3, Les Civilisations.

. Volume 1 is the Arabic text, Volume 2 is a translation into French. Reprinted by Maisonneuve in 1964 and 1981. The French text is also available from Aluka but requires a subscription.
. Reprint of the 1999 edition with corrections.
.
. Reprinted in Lange 2004, pp. 455–493.
.
. Reprinted with additions 1980.
. First published in 1981 by Cambridge University Press, .
. Excerpts from Levtzion & Hopkins 1981. Includes an extended introduction.
.
.
.
.
. Includes a plan of the site.

Further reading

.
.
.
. Reprinted in 1985 with corrections and additional texts, . Similar to Levtzion and Hopkins, 1981 & 2000.
.
.
.

External links

Ghana Empire - World History Encyclopedia
 African Kingdoms | Ghana
 Empires of west Sudan
 Kingdom of Ghana, Primary Source Documents
 Ancient Ghana — BBC World Service

 
1240 disestablishments
13th-century disestablishments in Africa
8th-century establishments in Africa
Countries in medieval Africa
History of Mauritania
History of Senegal
Political history of Mali
Sahelian kingdoms
Spread of Islam